The Participatiemaatschappij Vlaanderen (PMV) is an independent organization owned by the Flemish government which supports economic investment initiatives in Flanders.

History
The PMV was established on 31 July 1995 as a specialised subdivision of the GIMV and became an independent organization 26 June 1997.

See also
 Agoria
 Biotech Fund Flanders
 Flanders in Action
 Flanders Interuniversity Institute of Biotechnology (VIB)
 Flanders Investment and Trade
 FlandersBio
 Institute for the promotion of Innovation by Science and Technology (IWT)

Sources
 Participatiemaatschappij Vlaanderen
 Participatiemaatschappij Vlaanderen

Flemish government departments and agencies
Investment companies of Belgium